Daniel Holmes (born 6 January 1989) is an English semi-professional footballer who plays as a defender for Welsh Premier League club Connah's Quay Nomads. He is a product of Tranmere Rovers' youth system.

Career

Tranmere Rovers
Holmes was born in Birkenhead, Merseyside. He began his career with Tranmere Rovers, the team he supports, joining the club at the age of seven. He originally played as a forward but eventually became a defender. Having captained the youth and reserve teams, he signed his first professional in July 2007, shortly before the 2007–08 season.

Holmes spent the latter half of the season on loan at Conference North club Southport, making 15 appearances. At the end of 2008–09, having made one league appearance during a 1–0 defeat to Yeovil Town on 22 November 2008, Holmes was released by Tranmere.

The New Saints
Following his release, Holmes spent time on trial with Chester City before signing for The New Saints, joining his brother Tommy at the club. He made his debut in a 2–1 defeat to Icelandic team Knattspyrnufélagið Fram in the first qualifying round of the UEFA Europa League. At the end of his first season with the club, he was named in the Welsh Premier League team of the season.

He left TNS at the end of 2010–11, refusing to sign a new contract, and also being named in the Welsh Premier team of the season.

Tranmere Rovers (second spell)
On 27 June 2011, Holmes re-signed for Tranmere Rovers on a one-year contract. On 25 August 2011, he joined Fleetwood Town on a one-month loan to attempt to gain some first-team experience.

After breaking into the team in early 2012 and becoming a regular, and also winning the young player of the year award, Tranmere took up a further one year option on him for 2012–13.

Holmes scored his first goal for Tranmere in a 5–2 away win over Crawley Town on 22 September 2012.

Newport County
On 24 June 2015, following Tranmere's relegation into the National League, Holmes joined League Two club Newport County. He made his debut for Newport on 8 August 2015 versus Cambridge United. He was offered a new contract by Newport at the end of 2015–16 but the offer was withdrawn and he was released after he failed to accept the contract by the deadline of 10 June 2016.

AFC Fylde and York City
Holmes joined National League North club AFC Fylde in the summer of 2016. On 10 November 2016, he signed for National League club York City on a contract until the end of 2016–17. On 21 May 2017, Holmes started as York beat Macclesfield Town 3–2 at Wembley Stadium in the 2017 FA Trophy Final. He turned down a new contract with York in June 2017.

Bangor City
On 10 July 2017, Holmes signed for Welsh Premier League club Bangor City.

Connah's Quay Nomads
Following Bangor's demotion from the Welsh Premier League, Holmes joined Connah's Quay Nomads, with Nomads manager Andy Morrison stating Holmes was "the outstanding fullback in the league last season".

Career statistics

Honours
The New Saints
Welsh Premier League: 2009–10
Welsh League Cup: 2010–11

York City
FA Trophy: 2016–17

Individual
Welsh Premier League Team of the Year: 2009–10, 2010–11, 2017–18

References

External links

Danny Holmes profile at the Bangor City F.C. website

1989 births
Living people
Sportspeople from Birkenhead
English footballers
Association football defenders
Tranmere Rovers F.C. players
Southport F.C. players
The New Saints F.C. players
Fleetwood Town F.C. players
Newport County A.F.C. players
AFC Fylde players
York City F.C. players
Bangor City F.C. players
National League (English football) players
English Football League players
Cymru Premier players
Connah's Quay Nomads F.C. players